The Tanjil River is a perennial river of the West Gippsland catchment, located in the West Gippsland region of the Australian state of Victoria.

Course and features
The river descends  over its  course.

The Tanjil River is impounded by the Blue Rock Dam, that provides cooling water for thermal power stations sited in the Latrobe Valley, and to augment domestic water supplies. A small  hydroelectric power station is located on the river below the dam wall.

The Tanjil River sub-catchment area is managed by the West Gippsland Catchment Management Authority.

See also

 List of rivers of Australia

References

External links
 
 

West Gippsland catchment
Rivers of Gippsland (region)